Lionel Landry Djebi-Zadi (born 20 May 1982) is a French former professional footballer who played as a defender.

Career
Djebi-Zadi was born in Lyon. His previous clubs include SC Verl in Germany along with a string of lower league clubs in France, Switzerland and Germany.

He signed for Ross County in 2005. He scored his first and what turned out to be only goal in Scottish football in a 3–3 draw with Brechin City whilst playing for Ross County.

Djebi-Zadi went on trial at Inverness CT in May 2008 and was offered a one-year contract at the end of the season which he signed on 1 July. On 14 January 2009, Djebi-Zadi was told he was free to leave the club on loan, but made his starting debut for Caley on Terry Butcher's first game against Celtic creating speculation he could be a big player for the rest of the season. He signed a new one-year contract after impressing Butcher with his performances during the run in to the season. He struggled to hold down a regular place in the side and was released at the end of the 2009–10 season after his contract expired.

After a period without a club, Djebi-Zadi signed in 2011 for Saint Louisienne on the Indian Ocean island of La Reunion.

In October 2012 he had an unsuccessful trial with Indonesian club Sriwijaya.

References

External links
 

1982 births
Living people
French footballers
Footballers from Lyon
Association football defenders
Scottish Football League players
Scottish Premier League players
ASM Vénissieux players
FC Luzern players
Ross County F.C. players
SC Paderborn 07 players
SV Wilhelmshaven players
SC Verl players
Inverness Caledonian Thistle F.C. players
SS Saint-Louisienne players
French expatriate footballers
French expatriate sportspeople in Switzerland
Expatriate footballers in Switzerland
French expatriate sportspeople in Scotland
Expatriate footballers in Scotland
French expatriate sportspeople in Germany
Expatriate footballers in Germany